This is a list of Estonian television related events from 1972.

Events

Debuts
 13 February - television series "Vaata kööki" started. The series was hosted by Lilian Kosenkranius.

Television shows

Ending this year

Births

Deaths

See also
 1972 in Estonia

References

1970s in Estonian television